Kevin Kampl (born 9 October 1990) is a professional footballer who plays as a midfielder for Bundesliga club RB Leipzig. Born in Germany, he has represented the Slovenia national team at international level. Besides Germany, he has played in Austria.

Early life
Kampl was born in Solingen, Germany. His parents moved to Germany from Maribor, a city near the Austrian border in northeastern Slovenia. Kampl has dual citizenship and could have played for Germany, but opted for Slovenia early on.

Club career

Early career
Kampl began his career with Bayer Leverkusen. After some years in the youth team of Bayer Leverkusen II, he signed for SpVgg Greuther Fürth.

On 30 August 2010, he signed a one-season loan contract with SpVgg Greuther Fürth. Kampl made his first team debut on 29 October 2010 as a late substitute in a 2. Bundesliga tie with Erzgebirge Aue. After only half a season for Greuther Fürth, he returned to Bayer Leverkusen during the 2010–11 winter transfer window. Kampl made his Leverkusen 2010–11 season debut as a second-half substitute in the UEFA Europa League game against Metalist Kharkiv.

In the summer of 2011, Kampl transferred to 3. Liga side VfL Osnabrück. After having played a great season for Osnabrück, he joined newly promoted 2. Bundesliga club VfR Aalen for a transfer fee of €250,000. However, he played only four matches for Aalen, scoring two goals and assisting another three. 

This marvelous start drew the attention of well-financed Austrian champion Red Bull Salzburg and they acquired him just before the end of the transfer window by fulfilling his release clause in the amount of €3 million. He was nominated for the best player of the Austrian Bundesliga at the beginning of the 2013–14 season, but had to eventually concede to Philipp Hosiner.

Borussia Dortmund

On 22 December 2014, it was announced that he would join Borussia Dortmund on a five-year contract for a €12 million fee on 1 January 2015. He was originally going to RB Leipzig. He made his debut on 31 January 2015. On 28 April 2015, in the DFB-Pokal semi–final against Bayern Munich, Kampl came on in the 83rd minute for Jakub Błaszczykowski and was sent–off after receiving a second yellow card; Dortmund went through to the final via a penalty shoot-out.

Bayer Leverkusen
On 28 August 2015, Kampl returned to Bayer Leverkusen on a five-year deal. He made his debut on 12 September 2015 versus SV Darmstadt 98. On 26 September, Kampl scored his first goal for Leverkusen in a 3–0 away win against Werder Bremen. Later, on 20 October, he scored his first UEFA Champions League goal in a 4–4 home group stage draw against Roma.

RB Leipzig
On 31 August 2017, Kampl joined RB Leipzig on a four-year contract for a transfer fee of €20 million.

International career
Kampl made his senior debut for Slovenia on 12 October 2012, starting in a 2–0 away win against Cyprus. He scored his first goal on 6 September 2013 against Albania, which Slovenia won 1–0. Kampl scored his second goal in a UEFA Euro 2016 qualifying match against San Marino, the second of their 6–0 win. In October 2016, the Slovenian squad released a statement "condemning Kampl's absence from both games." In response, Kampl stated "Firstly, I always play with pride and happiness for Slovenia and I intend to do so in the future, and secondly, I have made it clear I will be available next time, I just need some rest now."

Kampl retired from the national team in late 2018 due to personal reasons. He earned 28 caps and scored 2 goals.

Career statistics

Club

International

Scores and results list Slovenia's goal tally first, score column indicates score after each Kampl goal.

Honours
Red Bull Salzburg
 Austrian Bundesliga: 2013–14
 Austrian Cup: 2013–14

RB Leipzig
DFB-Pokal: 2021–22

Individual
 Slovenian Footballer of the Year: 2013, 2014
 Kicker Bundesliga Team of the Season: 2015–16

See also
Slovenian international players

References

External links

 
 Kevin Kampl at kicker.de 

1990 births
Living people
People with acquired Slovenian citizenship
German people of Slovenian descent
People from Solingen
Sportspeople from Düsseldorf (region)
Footballers from North Rhine-Westphalia
German footballers
Slovenian footballers
Association football midfielders
Bayer 04 Leverkusen II players
SpVgg Greuther Fürth players
VfL Osnabrück players
Bayer 04 Leverkusen players
VfR Aalen players
FC Red Bull Salzburg players
Borussia Dortmund players
RB Leipzig players
Regionalliga players
2. Bundesliga players
3. Liga players
Austrian Football Bundesliga players
Bundesliga players
Slovenia youth international footballers
Slovenia under-21 international footballers
Slovenia international footballers
Slovenian expatriate footballers
German expatriate footballers
Slovenian expatriate sportspeople in Austria
German expatriate sportspeople in Austria
Expatriate footballers in Austria